Oskar Hordnes (26 October 1924 – 19 June 2011) was a Norwegian judge and chief of police.

He was born in Bergen. After graduating with the cand.jur. degree from the Royal Frederick University in 1949, he eventually became a police officer in his hometown. In 1970 he advanced to chief detective. From 1975 to 1982 he was a presiding judge in Gulating Court of Appeal, and from 1982 to 1992 he was the chief of police of Bergen.

References

1924 births
2011 deaths
Police officers from Bergen
University of Oslo alumni
Norwegian police chiefs
Norwegian judges